This is a list of Romanian football transfers for the 2016 summer transfer window. Only moves featuring 2016–17 Liga I are listed.

Liga I

Astra Giurgiu

In:

Out:

Botoșani

In:

Out:

CFR Cluj

In:

Out:

Concordia Chiajna

In:

Out:

CSM Politehnica Iași

In:

Out:

Universitatea Craiova

In:

Out:

Dinamo București

In:

Out:

Gaz Metan Mediaș

In:

Out:

Pandurii Târgu Jiu

In:

Out:

Poli Timișoara

In:

Out:

Steaua București

In:

Out:

Târgu Mureș

In:

Out:

Viitorul Constanța

In:

Out:

Voluntari

In:

Out:

References

Transfers
Romania
2016